Halsted was a station on the Chicago Transit Authority's Green Line in the Near West Side neighborhood of Chicago, Illinois. Halsted opened on November 6, 1893, and closed on January 9, 1994, when the entire Green Line closed for a renovation project. The station did not reopen with the rest of the Green Line on May 12, 1996, due to service cuts, and the station was demolished shortly after the Green Line reopened.

References

External links 
 Halsted/Lake station page at Chicago-L.org

Defunct Chicago "L" stations
Railway stations in the United States opened in 1893
Railway stations closed in 1994
1893 establishments in Illinois
1994 disestablishments in Illinois
CTA Green Line stations